The Saab 900 is a mid-sized automobile which was produced by Saab from 1978 until 1998 in two generations; the first from 1978 to 1993, and the second from 1994 to 1998.

The first-generation car was based on the Saab 99 chassis, though with a longer front end . The 900 was produced in 2- and 4-door sedan, and 3- and 5-door hatchback configurations and, from 1986, as a cabriolet (convertible) model. There were single- and twin-Zenith carburettor; fuel injected, and turbocharged engines, including both Full Pressure Turbo (FPT), and, in European models during the early 1990s, Low Pressure Turbos (LPT).

Saab 900 "Classic"

Overview 

The Saab 900 is a front-engine, front-wheel-drive mid-size car with a longitudinally mounted, 45-degree slanted, inline four-cylinder engine, double wishbone front suspension and beam-axle rear suspension. It was originally introduced on 12 May 1978, for the 1979 model year. Sales commenced in the fall of 1978.

Like its predecessor the 99, the 900 contained a number of unusual design features that distinguish it from most other cars. First, the B-engine, that was installed "backwards", with power delivered from the crank at the front of the car. Second, the transmission, technically a transaxle, bolted directly to the bottom of the engine to form the oil pan (albeit with separate oil lubrication). Thus, power from the crank would be delivered out of the engine at the front, then transferred down and back to the transmission below, via a set of chain-driven primary gears. In similar fashion, Mini's also had their gearbox mounted directly below the engine; however, the Mini gearbox and engine shared the same oil, whereas the Saab 900 (and 99) gearboxes contained a separate sump for engine oil.

Refined over several decades of two-digit Saab models, the 900's double wishbone suspension design provided excellent handling and road feel. The rear suspension comprised a typical beam axle design, stabilized with a Panhard rod. However, the attachment points between the axle and chassis made up an unusual configuration that, in essence, consists of two Watt's linkages at either end of the axle: A lower control arm attaches the axle to the bottom of the vehicle, while an upper link attaches at the top but faces towards the rear, unlike a typical four-link design with both lower and upper links facing forward.

Early models did not have sway bars; they began appearing on certain models in 1985, and, in U.S. and possibly other markets, became standard on all trim levels by the late 1980s. The sway bars decreased body roll, but at the expense of some ride comfort and when driven aggressively, increased inside wheel spin. The front and rear bars' diameters were unchanged throughout the model's run.

The 900 has a deeply curved windshield, providing the best driver visibility. The dashboard was curved to enable easy reach of all controls, and featured gauges lit up from the front. Saab engineers placed all controls and gauges in the dashboard according to their frequency of use and/or importance so that the driver need only divert their gaze from the road for the shortest possible time and by the smallest angle. This is why, for example, the oft-used radio is placed so high in the dashboard.  In keeping with the paradigm of its predecessor, the 99 model, the 900 employed a door design unique in automotive manufacturing, with an undercutting sweep to meet the undercarriage, forming a tight, solid unit when the door was closed. This feature also eliminated the stoop in the cabin at the footing of the door, as seen in automobiles of other manufacturers, thereby preventing water and debris from collecting and possibly entering the cabin or initiating corrosion, as well as enabling passengers to enter and exit the cabin without need to step over several inches of ledge.

The 900 underwent minor cosmetic design changes for 1987, including restyled front end and bumpers that went from a vertical to a more sloped design. To save money, Saab kept the basic undercarriage more or less unchanged throughout the 900's production run.

The Saab 900 could be ordered with different options. One highly sought-after option was called the Aero or, as it was known in the U.S. "Special Performance Group" (SPG). The Aero/SPG incorporated (depending on the market and model year) a body skirt; a sport-suspension (1987+) that included shorter, stiffer springs, stiffer shocks, and sway bars; leather seats; premium stereo; and air conditioning. Each of these features could also be ordered independently from Saab's Accessories Catalog for fitment to standard models. 

Another desirable UK option at this time was the fitment of very distinctive Minilite alloy wheels. Initially these had the words 'Minilite' and 'Saab' cast in raised lettering; later Saabs had a similar wheel made by Ronal. 

Power output varied by model year and market, but 900S and 900 Turbo models produced from 1985 and onward were fitted with a 16-valve engine, while the basic 900 kept the earlier 8-valve engine.

A 1989 Saab 900 SPG, owned by Peter Gilbert of Wisconsin, was driven over a million miles before being donated to The Wisconsin Automotive Museum. Peter Gilbert claimed a million miles out of the turbocharging unit in addition to the engine itself. Saab gave Mr Gilbert a Saab 9-5 Aero.

History 

The only bodywork originally available was the three or five-door hatchback style, which was seen as more modern at the time. The EMS was only available with three doors while the automatic-equipped GLE was only offered with five. Saab's model years were generally introduced in August/September of the preceding year.

The Turbo had a different grille from the naturally aspirated models, which received a design with a hexagonal central element. For the 1980 model year, all versions received the sleeker turbo-style grille. The 1980 900 also received larger taillights rather than the earlier 99 units, as well as lower, adjustable head restraints.  1980 was also the first year for a five-speed gearbox, originally only available in the EMS and the Turbo.

The four-door 900 sedan was introduced in Geneva 1980, as a result of dealer pressure. This introduction corresponded with the phase-out of the old Saab B engine in favor of the lighter Saab H engine. With the introduction of the H-engine, Saab simplified the model designation on the international markets outside Scandinavia: GL for the model with the single carburettor, GLs for the models with the twin carburettor engine, GLi as designation for the models with fuel injection without turbo, and correspondingly "Turbo" for the top models with the corresponding engine. The GLE was now offered only as a better equipped four-door Sedan. Model designations in the USA became just 900 for the base model and 900S for the models with 8V i. The EMS designation was dropped. In the early 1980s, most 900s were produced in Trollhättan. However, coinciding with the introduction of the 9000, more of the 900 production took place elsewhere. The Valmet plant in Finland, referenced below under the 900c, also produced regular 900s, a total of 238,898 examples. The plant in Arlöv (now closed), near Malmö, also produced some 900s. For 1981 all models except for the GL three-door received a considerable boost in equipment, as well as broader side trims, larger luggage compartments and fuel tanks. The spare tire was moved to underneath the floor, rather than standing upright in the luggage compartment.

A big change for 1982 was the introduction of Saab's Automatic Performance Control (APC), a.k.a. boost controller for the Turbo models. The APC employed a knock sensor, allowing the engine to use different grades of gasoline without engine damage. Another new feature that year was the introduction of central locking doors (on the GLE and Turbo). The long-wheelbase 900 CD was also introduced. Asbestos-free brakes were introduced in 1983, an industry first. The front pads were semi-metallic while the rears were made from silica. The GLE model gained a new central console, while the decor strips on the bumpers of all models were made wider (necessitating wider trim pieces on the flanks as well). A new luxury package was made available on Turbo cars.

Model year 1984 saw the introduction of the 16-valve DOHC B202 engine in Europe. With a turbocharger and intercooler, it could produce 175 hp/129 kW in the Turbo 16 model (less for catalyst-equipped engines). The Turbo 16 Aero [designated SPG, Special Performance Group in North American Markets] had a body kit allowing the car to reach 210 km/h (130 mph). A different grille and three-spoke steering wheel appeared across all models. The connection between the side strips and the bumpers was changed, Turbo hatchbacks received a black trim piece between the taillights, and the GLi began replacing the twin-carburetted GLs. At the 1983 Frankfurt Motor Show a two-door sedan was shown; it went on sale in January 1984, initially only as a GLi. The two-door sedan was only ever built at the Valmet plant in Finland.

The dual-carburettor model (and "GLs" nomenclature) was gone for 1985. Now, the base 900 had the single-carburettor engine, while the 900i added fuel injection. Two turbocharged models were offered: The 900 Turbo had the 8-valve engine, while the Turbo 16 (also Aero) had the 16-valve intercooled unit. Wheel trims (naturally aspirated cars) and alloys (turbos) were redesigned, and the Turbos also received chromed grilles. The eight-valve Turbo was also available as a two-door. Side marker lights at the rear of the front fenders were also added, while the 900i gained new interior fabrics. The new Saab-Scania badge was introduced, placed in the steering wheel, on the bonnet, and on the bootlid. 1986 also marked the introduction of the 16-valve 900i 16 and 900 convertible, both only for North America initially.

1987 facelift
 

A new grille, headlamps, front turn signal lights and  "integrated" bumpers freshened the 900's look for 1987, though the sheetmetal was largely unchanged. Several common parts for the 900 and 9000 were introduced for 1988 model year, including brakes and wheel hubs. This also meant that Saab finally abandoned the use of parking brakes which acted on the front wheels. Power steering was added on the 900i. The base 900, available with two or four doors, kept the pre-facelift appearance for 1987. Also new was the carburetted 900c. The Aero model received slightly bigger fender extensions so as to accommodate larger wheels, while the window trim was blacked out on all models. For 1988 catalytic converters became available with all fuel injected engines in Europe, all with cruise control as standard equipment to further help lower emissions. A water- and oil-cooled turbocharger (replacing the older oil-cooled unit) was also introduced to improve the unit's durability.

In each of the seasons 1987 and 1988, there was a special 'one-make' race series, in the UK, called the Saab Turbo Mobil Challenge, sponsored by Saab Great Britain and Mobil. It was run by the BARC.

The eight-valve engines were phased out in 1989 and 1990, with the turbo versions having been removed in North American markets by the end of 1984; North American 900S models received the non-turbo 16-valve engine for 1986. A non-turbo 16-valve engine replaced the 8-valve FI unit in the 900i (900S in North America) as well, while the carbureted engines were dropped. In Europe the eight-valve Turbo dropped out with the 1989 model year, with the limited production 900 T8 Special built to celebrate this. 805 were built for Sweden, featuring Aero trim and equipment. Anti-lock brakes were introduced as well, and were standard on Turbo models.

Larger pinion bearings were fitted to manual gearboxes for 1989 to improve their strength and reliability. ABS brakes and driver's side airbags were standardized for all North American market cars beginning with the 1990 model year. In the spring of 1990 the naturally aspirated 900i 16 Cabriolet was added.

A 2.1 L (2119 cc/129 in³) (B212) engine was introduced for 1991. This engine was available in the United States until the end of the original 900, but in most of Europe, this engine was replaced a year later with the earlier B202 because of tax regulations in many European countries for engines with a displacement of more than 2000 cc. Front seats from the 9000 were standard from 1991 on and electronically adjustable ones were available as an option. Airbags became available as an option in Europe as well, while there was also an Aero version of the Cabriolet. The Saab 900 no longer offered the mesh wheels. There was also a change in the door locks, which carried over to the 900NG.

For 1992 there were mostly equipment adjustments, with ABS brakes finding their way into most of the lineup everywhere. 1993 brought no changes, and "classic" 900 production ended on 26 March 1993, with a new GM2900 platform-based 900 entering production shortly afterwards. The final classic convertibles were still sold as 1994 models, with the Special Edition commanding top dollar in the resale market even today.

In all, 908,817 Saab 900s were built, including 48,888 convertibles.

Convertible 

In the mid-1980s, the president of Saab-Scania of America (U.S. importer owned by Saab AB), Robert J. Sinclair, suggested a convertible version to increase sales. The first prototype was built by ASC, American Sunroof Company (now American Specialty Cars). Similarly, Lynx Motors International Ltd produced two "convertible" models, just prior to the official 1986 launch.

The Trollhättan design department, headed by Björn Envall, based its version on the 3-door hatchback while the Finnish plant used the sturdier 2-door version, which also looked better and was therefore selected for production. The initial production was not planned to be large but the orders kept coming in and a classic was born.

The new car was shown for the first time at the Frankfurt Motor Show (IAA) in the autumn of 1983. The first prototype aroused enormous interest and in April 1984, Saab decided to put the car in production at Valmet Automotive in Finland. The production of the first 900 convertible started during the spring of 1986.

The convertible usually had a 16-valve turbocharged engine, some with intercooler, but it was also offered in certain markets with a fuel-injected 2.1 L naturally aspirated engine from 1991 on.

Influenced by General Motors (GM), in 1994 the New Generation (NG) 900 SE, based on the Opel Vectra chassis, was introduced. While this design contained styling cues reminiscent of the classic 900, the GM 900 was fundamentally a different car. For many fans of the marque, the GM 900 marked the end of Saab's technology-driven design philosophy and, in their view, the beginning of the dilution of the Saab brand.

The cabriolet/convertible, however, was made on the 'classic' chassis for an additional year. 

In US and Canadian markets, commemorative versions were produced for 1994 featuring special charcoal metallic "Nova Black" paint, a wood dash, black leather piping on the seats and higher-performing engines.

Engine development 

Saab introduced a turbocharger in 1978 in its 99 Turbo with the B engine (based on the Triumph Slant-4 engine). This engine was also used in early 900 Turbo models.

For 1981 the B-engine was re-designed as the H engine, which was used through to 1993 (and 1994 cabriolets). Unlike the earlier version, the H-engine is very durable. Saab used Bosch-made mechanical K-Jetronic continuous fuel injection in the fuel injected and 8-valve turbocharged versions, and the Bosch LH 2.2, 2.4 and 2.4.2 and Lucas Automotive electronic fuel injection systems were used in the 16-valve versions. The 2.1 L inline-four 16-valve engine used the Bosch LH 2.4.2 EZK electronic ignition system with knock sensor. 1981 was also the first year that the Turbo was available with an automatic transmission. The four-speed manual option disappeared after this year.

What set the 900 Turbo apart from its turbo-equipped competitors, especially in the early- and mid-1980s, was the development and use of the Automatic Performance Control (APC) boost controller from 1982. The system allowed the engine to run at the limits of engine knocking. The system had a knock sensor attached to the intake side of the motor block and if knocking of any kind was present, the APC-system would decrease the charge pressure by opening a wastegate, a bypass to the exhaust. This enabled the use of various octane fuels and also made the use of the turbocharger safer for the engine. By 1983, Saab had sold 100,000 turbo-charged cars and were leading the world.

At first, Saab used a Garrett turbocharger (T3), which was oil-cooled. From 1988 through 1990, water-cooled T3s were fitted. In 1990, Saab fitted Mitsubishi TE-05 turbochargers in the SPG models only for the USA; for other countries, and for the US from 1991, all 900 Turbos were fitted with the TE-05. Also water-cooled, the TE-05 was slightly smaller than the Garrett T3s, providing improved throttle response and quicker spool-up. The TE-05's exhaust inlet flange utilizes a Garrett T3 pattern.

Engines
 1979–1989: 2.0 L (1985 cc) B201 NA, single-carb,  at 5200 rpm and 
 1979–1984: 2.0 L (1985 cc) B201 NA, dual-carb,  at 5200 rpm and 
 1979–1985: 2.0 L (1985 cc) B201 Turbo,  at 5000 rpm and 
 1986–1989: 2.0 L (1985 cc) B201 Intercooled turbo,  at 5000 rpm and 
 1984–1993: 2.0 L (1985 cc) B202 16-valve turbo,  at 5500 rpm and -
 1987–1993: 2.0 L (1985 cc) B202 16-valve, NA,  at 6100 rpm and -
 1990–1993: 2.0 L (1985 cc) B202 16-valve low pressure turbo (LPT),  at 5600 rpm and 
 –1994: 2.0 L (1985 cc) B202 16-valve intercooled turbo (FPT) in the convertible.
 1991–1993: 2.1 L (2119 cc) B212 NA, FI,  at 6000 rpm and

Performance
 Saab 900i; 118 PS (DIN). Acceleration 0–100 km/h (62 mph) 11.4 sec. Top speed .
 Saab 900 Turbo; 145 PS (DIN). Acceleration 0–100 km/h (62 mph) 9.5 sec. Top speed .
 Saab 900 Turbo 16 S; 175 PS (DIN). Acceleration 0–100 km/h (62 mph) 8.5 sec. Top speed .

Special models

900 GLi Gold 
The Gold special edition was available in the UK in 1981 as the first 900 4-door saloons; these had turbo-spec velour interior finished in either blue or black with gold pinstripes, twin air vent bonnet and fuel gauge showing tank contents in litres.

900 Tjugofem 
The Tjugofem (Twenty-five in Swedish) Saloon was released in a batch of 300 to celebrate Saab's 25th year in the UK. These had the 1985cc 8-Valve engine with Bosch K-Jetronic fuel injection. Interior trim was blue turbo velour with a special gear knob with the car's number. Exterior the model was a standard non-turbo apart from alloy wheels, Tjugofem pinstriping and Turbo style rear spoiler.

900c 
900c was built in Uusikaupunki, Finland and in Arlöv, Sweden just outside Malmö, was a late 1980s carburetted model. It used an eight-valve B201 engine with a single carburettor producing  and included power steering as standard equipment.

900 Aero/T16S or 900 SPG 
In 1984, Saab introduced a high performance model known in Europe as the Aero. In North America, the model designation became SPG (Special Performance Group - per Saab USA's own literature - SAAB data correctly refers to it as Sports PacKage) due to a model and trademark conflict with GM in English speaking countries and the USA. In the UK it was known as the T16S. The Aero/SPG was the first Saab to be delivered with the  16-valve turbo motor. The concept Aero/SPG vehicles were met with huge acceptance by the motoring community.

There were many differences between the regular 900 turbo and SPG, Most notable was the body kit that wrapped around the car and the specialty rims. The engine was tuned to put out higher hp, some have reported that the engines internals were different and that Saab used better materials to withstand the higher output. The SPG also had a lowered and stiffer suspension.

These prototypes were painted a mother of pearl white and had red leather interiors with matching Colorado Red dashboards. Unfortunately, in testing, the pearlescent white was found to be too difficult to repair in terms of color, and as such, this color was never offered to the public for sale. Only 29 of these prototype Aero/SPGs were manufactured and are considered quite rare by collector standards. The factory retained, and subsequently crushed, 22 of the white prototypes. The remaining seven vehicles were employed as press vehicles for the series launch. Four of the prototypes were sent to the United States. One was wrecked in 1993. The other three are owned by collectors in California, New York and Rhode Island. The three European SPG vehicles are also collector owned, one of which receiving a comprehensive restoration between 2007 and 2010. Hällberga bildemontering Sweden junked one in 1999 (Owners own remark).

In 1984, the first year of consumer production, the Aero/SPG was delivered in black and in silver (in markets other than USA). In Australia the 1985 silver models had a dark red interior, including full red leather. In the US the black cars were featured with tan leather interiors. In Canada and in the rest of the world, the cars were black with red leather interiors. In the US market the SPG was offered in; Black in 1985, Grey in 1986 - 1987, Grey, Black(400) and Silver(1) in 1988, Grey and Black in 1989,  Red and Black in 1990 and Red(40), Black(105) and Beryl Green(109) in 1991. Production of the SPG was extremely limited and paint color availability varied by year. The final year of production was 1991 in the USA. In total, over the course of six years, 7,625 SPGs were built and imported to North America. In the rest of the world, Aeros were equally rare—especially those loaded with leather interiors, A/C and other luxuries considered standard by upscale North American consumers. The SPG is fondly regarded by car collectors and Saab enthusiasts.

900EP (900S) 
The EP was a special Ecopower model for the Italian market. It uses a 16 valve low pressure turbo (LPT) engine and has a pre-heated catalytic converter. It was sold outside Italy with a 900S badge.

900 CD

In 1977 Valmet Automotive had created an elongated executive model of the 99 combi coupé named Finlandia. With the introduction of the 900, the concept was transferred onto the new chassis. The Finlandia was 20 cm (7.9 in) longer than standard, by adding 10 cm (3.9 in) to both front and rear doors, but only the rear leg room was larger. The idea behind the car was to produce an executive car which would appeal to the Nordic market as an option to big German and US sedans. The first cars were sold as the Saab 900 Finlandia. These cars made between 1979 and 1982 were combi coupés, and did not have the 'CD' designation. Very few examples of these early models were exported. After the more representable 4-door sedan was introduced, the CD designation replaced the nickname and the Swedish Saab headquarters started to officially offer the car for export. The 900 CD was made at the Valmet Automotive factory in Uusikaupunki, Finland. At least in the domestic market the cars were essentially built to the buyers wishes. The list of optional extras for the CD included a leather interior, reading lights, rear blinds, footrests, and even an in-car telephone. However, due to the cars special nature and demanding customer base, the trim and technical specifications of some examples can be unique. The Uusikaupunki factory clearly had high aspirations for the car. Valmet Automotive even developed a prototype of an even longer, seven seat limousine as a concept car of an official state car. These aspirations were moderately met, although the Finnish government didn't actually ever commission Saab to build such a car, the Saab 900CD was favoured as an official executive vehicle by several local municipalities such as the City of Oulu and several larger corporations in the wood and paper industry and electronics manufacture industry. It was also used by the Finnish government as the official state car of the Prime Minister during The Second Government of Mauno Koivisto between 1979 – 1982. He was particularly fond of its performance as it was equipped with a turbocharged engine, and he could thus out-run his bodyguards Saab 900's which were naturally aspirated. In total 579 cars were built between 1979 and 1986.

900 Springtime in Sweden [SIS] 
In 1988, Saab commissioned 288 special convertibles, one for each of its United States dealers, as part of the 1988 Dealer Meeting in Sweden. Dubbed the Springtime in Sweden, or "SiS" model these cars are differentiated by their Aero/SPG-like bodywork and 3-spoke wheels. Each car was painted black, with buffalo grey leather interiors and black convertible roofs. Each car was marked with a special "Springtime in Sweden" emblem that was attached to the lower left of the glove box door. The emblems were all identical and are not serialized. All were Turbo models. 

Of the 288 built, approximately 4 were automatics and the remaining 284 had 5-speed manual transmissions, per Saab records. Emblems on the exterior body were deleted in the scheme of the SPG, with only the word Saab and the Saab-Scania roundel on the trunk appearing on the car. The car was fitted with the standard Saab grille for the period, but did not feature the miniature "turbo emblem." The SPG suspension was not fitted, and aside from the SPG body fairings and dash emblem, the SIS is identical to a standard 1988 900 Turbo Convertible in the black/grey color combination. 

The SiS models were sold, one to each dealer, however some dealers used the opportunity to trade their SiS convertible with other dealers in an effort to get other car models (specifically the 9000CD) for sale. Contrary to popular belief, the SIS was not given to the dealers for free. Dealers paid for their own car, the invoice price even reflected the increased cost of the SPG bodywork. Each dealer did however receive an Orrefors crystal vase, engraved with the Saab-Scania logo, packed in the trunk when the SIS was delivered stateside as a surprise gift. 

Please note: Some individuals in an attempt to portray provenance of their vehicles, point to a sticker behind the driver side door card,  that reads, in part, "AERO" and "CABRIO". This sticker was at one time affixed to ALL c900 convertibles and does not designate the vehicle as being of the SIS series. There a numerous "fake" SiS models being listed for sale/referred to as an authentic SiS. There, too, has been reports of the SiS glove box badge being stolen/replicated. One indicator of an authentic SIS is the inclusion of the SiS glove box badge, along with the original window sticker and matching VINs.

900 Enduro 
The Enduro was a special version of the 1980 900 Turbo assembled by Saab Scania Australia Pty. Ltd.; only eleven 900 Enduros were made along with a full body kit as a spare. Ken Matthews Prestige (a large Sydney-based Saab dealer at the time) were originally commissioned by Saab Australia to oversee the design and implementation of the overall engineering package, with the body modifications themselves designed and built by Purvis Cars of "Eureka" fame.

The package consisted of large fibreglass wheel arches to accommodate the extra track width  front and  rear, front air dam and rear fiberglass spoiler fully  wider than normal 900 Turbo of that year. Extra gauges (oil pressure [0 to 500kPa - 0 to 75 psi], battery voltage [10 to 16 volts] and ammeter [-50 to +50 A])  were mounted where the radio usually was. The radio was moved to a new lower centre console that was not fitted to the 1980 model as standard. It was Eurovox MCC-9090R cassette player and radio with Voxson VX-89 graphic equaliser powering 6 speakers - 2x4" full range front, 2x1" dome tweeter overhead and 2x6" tri-axial rear. Apart from this, the car had a standard turbo version interior with green seats and triangular center steering wheel.

The cars were fitted with either gold or black-centred (depending on body colour) Simmons 'P-4' 3-piece composite alloy 7.5x15" wheels with polished lip. Tyres were 225/50VR15 Pirelli Cinturato P7 units in both the front and rear. Spare wheel was a full size steel rim 5x15" with Michelin 175/70HR15 tyre.

Suspension was improved with 290 mm (free length) by 17 mm 368 lb 7.1 turn springs up front and 300 mm (free length) by 16 mm 484 lb 9 turn springs at the rear. Steering caster was set to +2.25 deg +/- .25 deg, camber to -1.75 deg +/- .25 deg and toe in was 2.5 mm +/- 0.5 mm.

To increase performance, the waste gate was set at 17 psi (1.2 bar), which delivered a claimed  from its 8-valve B201 slant-4 engine. Upstream water injection came standard.

Paint was a 2-pack Dulux Acran enamel and came in at least four known colours: 137B "Aquamarine Blue Metallic"  and a very light green (almost white) referred to as 152G "Marble White". There was at least one Enduro painted in 121B "Solar Red" and a fourth in 148B "Acacia Green Metallic". The hood, side window frames and rear deck were painted in Dulux GT Satin Black. Large "ENDURO" (in 99 TURBO style font) stripes were emblazoned on the hood, the rear deck and along both sides at sill level, although not all vehicles were treated to the "Enduro" hood graphics.

None of the cars are known to be ever exported from Australia, but it's believed that no more than 6 examples survived to this day, with only 3 of them actually known. 2 of those were already extensively modified over the years, one awaiting full restoration. Some of the cars had the wheel centre replaced from Simmons P-4 to deeper dish V-4 version. There is also known a "half-Enduro" car, now owned by a real Enduro owner. The Saab dealer in Adelaide did the same Enduro fiberglass bodykit for their showcar (with a paint scheme of then non-existent 900 Lux) and advertised the conversion option for $5000. This was quickly put to an end as the dealer chose not to risk his dealership agreement with Saab.

900 Lux 

The Lux was a special model available 1983 and 1984. It came in a two-tone paint, usually slate blue metallic on top and silver below. It had a three-spoke steering wheel or more rarely four-spoke. It was one of the rarest models sold by the company, but the number produced is unknown.

900 SE 
The SE model was produced in May 1990 and came with 5-doors Iridium Blue with blue pinstripes down the sides. The car also featured multi-spoke alloys, full electrics, grey leather seats, and wood effect as standard. Only 300 were originally made for the UK market, with a choice of either a 2.0L N/A engine or 2.0L LPT version. Later more SE versions were made, e.g. the 3-door LPT 900 SE Aero (1993). However, these were not part of the original limited run.

900 Carlsson 
The Carlsson was a special edition 900 produced in honour of Erik Carlsson, of which only 600 examples were sold in the three years it was in production (1990 to 1992) and only available in the UK. It is thought by most that there were only 200 examples sold but in fact there were 200 examples sold for each of those three years. So it would be more probable that there are 200 examples of each of the three colours, which were black, white and red. All 900 Carlssons were 3-door hatchbacks, had a body coloured AirFlow body kit, were fitted with twin chrome exhausts, whaletail rear spoiler and were powered by the 1,985 cc turbocharged engine with an upgraded (Red) APC producing . The 900 Carlsson was also equipped with the "Type 8" primary gear set.

1993 and 1994 Commemorative Editions 
314 Commemorative Edition 900 Turbo 3-door Hatchback Coupés were made for the U.S. market in 1993. All the cars were painted solid black with a tan leather interior and had 5-speed manual transmissions. The cars rode on the SPG suspension. The interior was further embellished by a walnut dash facia and a leather gear knob and gaiter. The wheels were 15" directionals painted medium-gray metallic units with a polished lip. Each Commemorative Edition was shipped with a small brass plaque indicating its number in the series. The plaques were serialized to indicate its number out of 325. However, only 314 were actually built. In addition, 15 identically equipped cars were shipped to Canada, and were equipped with metric (kilometer) speedometer instruments.

500 Commemorative Edition 900T convertibles were delivered to the U.S. market in 1994. They were the last 500 classic 900 convertibles to be built. They had the same performance modifications as the 1993 Commemorative Edition vehicles with the exception of the lower SPG suspension. They all had the 5-speed manual transmission, and came with the same uniquely styled wheels, walnut dash facia, and leather gear knob and gaiter. The tan leather interior was further enhanced with black piping, which was exclusive to this model. The cars were all painted Nova Black Metallic (another feature exclusive to the 1994 Commemorative Edition) and had tan canvas tops. 500 identically equipped cars were shipped to Canada but have metric instruments. The 1994 CE vehicles did not have a plaque designating or celebrating the series. The VIN numbers do however run sequentially which, along with the Ruby, were the only Saab special edition series to do so.

900 Ruby 
Only available in the UK, the Ruby had the   'Carlsson' engine but no body kit. All were in 'Ruby' Red and can be distinguished from other 900s by the colour-coded bumpers and grey (rather than silver) alloy wheels. They also had the unique air-conditioned interior of buffalo leather with Zegna pure wool inserts in the seats and door panels. There were 150 examples and were the last classic style 900s sold in the UK.

Swedish Special Edition 
15 rarer LHD "Ruby" versions were also produced. 8 were made available to the Swedish market, known as the "Swedish Special Edition" and the rest were scattered in Europe. They were identical to the UK spec but had a more refined lower dash or knee guard and electric front seats.

Conversions 

 Lynx Engineering produced two "convertible" models, just prior to the official 1986 launch.
 A demountable camper module, the Toppola, was created for the 3/5-door hatchback.
 Coachbuilder Nilsson built a wagon variant, the 'Safari'.
 There were also a few limousine conversions. A typical modification is a 20 cm wheelbase stretch.

Dealer models 
Some Saab dealers made special models. Saab Wimbledon made the Sprint and the Sport. The Sprint had a special body kit, lower, stiffer springs, and Pirelli Cinturato P7 on 7"x16" wheels. It also came with an intercooler, full colour-coding and 3-spoke leather steering wheel. The Sport had alloy wheels, full colour-coding and spoilers, uprated suspension, 3-spoke leather steering wheel, Clarion stereo and an electric aerial. Heuschmid GmbH offered options such as tuning, intercooler, suspensions tweaking and custom alloy wheels. Lynx Motors in the UK made a short run conversion of the two-door 900 shell to a convertible. The Winchester edition was a 4-door slate blue sedan and blue velour interior and wood trims.

Saab A.I.M of the Netherlands made two special models. 
 Red Arrow: a red 900 Turbo 8V two-door (MY 1987 and 1988 - slant nose) with a grey AirFlow body kit and a whale tail spoiler. 150 were planned, 100 with whale tail and SuperInca wheels and 50 without whaletail and with 15-spoke Turbo85 wheels instead (shortage of expensive parts). Tan cloth interior with Carlsson steering wheel, manual side mirrors, window and no air-conditioning. The Red Arrow is sometimes referred to as a "poor man's Carlsson" because while using the same body kit, it was not colour-coded, only equipped with tan velour interior instead of leather and used the outdated 8-valve turbo engine - this was later described as an attempt of the dealer to make last 8-valve versions appealing and somewhat special to make some profit. This was similar to the Swedish 900 T8 Special (model year 1989).
 Silver Arrow (MY 1985 and 1986, flat nose): Metallic silver 900 Turbo 8V sedan (known as Tudor or notchback) with special red/anthracite side striping, wooden four-spoke steering wheel and gear knob, aubergine velvet interior, with only manual windows and mirrors. The engine featured an intercooler and produced  (no catalytic converter for Silver Arrow, so the Red Arrow made a bit less hp as it had it fitted already). 200 Silver Arrows were made (many sources only claim 150). 

Both 'Arrows' have a 1-150 and 1-200 numbered plaque on the dashboard and also a  logo on the sides of the hood - above the fenders and on the back. It is believed that none of Arrows actually reached planned numbers for the limited production run - highest Red Arrow known is 138, Silver Arrow is 186. There are also few convertible versions styled as the Red Arrow (red car with grey AirFlow body kit), with no special version designated to it.

Saab 900 NG (1994-1998) 

The second or 'new' generation Saab 900 (also referred to as the GM900 or NG900 among enthusiasts) was built on GM's GM2900 platform as a replacement for the "classic" first-generation Saab 900. This all-new 900 was produced in 1994 through 1998 model years. In mid-1998 it received over 1100 individual improvements (although some were actually introduced on the 1998 model 900), and was renamed the Saab 9-3 (in most markets; in the US the new model was introduced in 1999).

Variants

Variants included 900i (4-cylinder, non-turbo), S (4-cylinder, non-turbo in the USA; sometimes turbo in other markets) and SE (4-cylinder turbo or V6) models in three-door, five-door and convertible body styles. For 1997 and 1998 only, there was also a Saab 900 Talladega, after a record-breaking endurance test in 1996, on the Talladega Superspeedway.

Trim levels in "S" and "SE" models varied greatly in the models although in general SE models included Automatic Climate Control (ACC), leather interiors, wood-trimmed dashboards, and 16" wheels.

Depending on market, the NG900 was available with a choice of 2.0 L or 2.3 L Saab 16-valve DOHC engines (Saab engine codes B204 and B234) in naturally aspirated or turbocharged form (2.0 L only), as well as a 2.5 L version of GM's European 54° V6 engine. Engine management for the turbos was by Saab Trionic 5 with Direct Ignition (SDI) and Automatic Performance Control (APC), and for non-turbos by Bosch Motronic fuel injection. A distributor-operated ignition system was provided for naturally aspirated engines in some markets.

In contrast to the 'classic' Saab 900 with its longitudinally mounted engine and front-hinged hood (bonnet), the NG900 had a more-common transversely mounted engine with rear-hinged hood (bonnet).

The convertible variant was introduced in 1995 (1994 is a continuation of the C900 line). Convertibles were produced at the Valmet plant in Finland. Convertibles were available in both "S" and "SE" trim levels.

Sensonic
The 'Sensonic' clutch variant (available on Turbo models only) provided a manual gear lever as in a standard manual transmission car but omitted the clutch pedal in favor of electronics which could control the clutch faster than an average driver, essentially turning it into a clutchless manual transmission.

When the driver started to move the gearshift, a computer-controlled microprocessor would drive an electric motor, in turn, operating a hydraulic actuator connected to the clutch master cylinder, which used hydraulic fluid, and controlled the clutch automatically. With the car in gear but stationary, the clutch was released only when the throttle was applied. If neither brake nor gas pedal was depressed, a warning tone sounded and a message flashed on the on-board display, and if no action was taken after 7 seconds, the engine was shut off.

Printed in error, a "Hill Start" function for Sensonic-equipped cars (as described in the owner's manual under "Rolling") was intended to assist in getting underway on hills to prevent rolling forwards or backwards. However, this feature was not implemented on any production unit.

The 'Sensonic' clutch ceased production when the 900 model was replaced in 1998.

Saab Information Display
The NG900 introduced the Saab Information Display, or SID (available on S or SE models only), which gave the driver real-time information while driving, such as fuel efficiency and outside temperature. Base specification cars had a digital clock in place of the SID and a non-digital instrument panel with a mechanical odometer (as opposed to the digital odometer on higher-spec models). The SID also controls other vehicle components, including but not limited to audible warnings for turn signals and the vehicle's horn.

NG engines
 2.0 L B204I normally aspirated 16-valve four cylinder, 
 2.0 L B206I normally aspirated 16-valve four cylinder with no balance shafts, 
 2.0 L B204L 16-valve turbo intercooled, 
 2.3 L B234I naturally aspirated 16-valve four cylinder, 
 2.5 L B258I 24-valve 54º V6,

Night Panel

One Saab innovation, inspired by the company's roots in aeronautics, was the 'Black Panel' feature available in classic models through the turn of the panel dimming knob, and subsequently available (on S or SE models only), through the touch of a button on the SID (Saab Information Display) digital panel (classics had analog display), which extinguished most instrument panel lights, to eliminate distraction from dash lights during night driving. While active, the SID activated feature permitted darkened instruments to re-illuminate themselves when they required driver attention — if for example, the engine speed increased alarmingly or if the fuel level should drop below . This feature was later renamed 'Night Panel' in Saab 9-3 and Saab 9-5 models. In the later Night Panel version, the speedometer is only illuminated up to the 87 mph/140 km/h mark. The remainder of the scale will only be illuminated if the speed of the car exceeds 84 mph/135 km/h.

900i

Under General Motors, Saab was repositioned as a luxury marque. This meant that the NG900 would be positioned, and priced, above the Opel Vectra, with which it shared its chassis platform. It would also make the bottom-of-the-range 900i more expensive than the Vectra. This led to cost-reduction measures for the 900i. The 900i would lose its rear-window wiper, the exclusive Saab Information Display, and would utilize a different instrument layout with a mechanical odometer instead of a digital one; first versions were even lacking tachometer. The NG900i would also lose its rear spoiler. Some 900i models were later equipped with a standard instrument cluster and the basic SID.

The 900i was only available in Europe, Australia, New Zealand and Japan as a three-door or a five-door with a choice of a 2.0 or 2.3 L engine. It did not sell very well in the UK and Australia, where the S and SE models were popular with Saab drivers. It was, however, popular as a cheaper alternative to the S and SE models.

Special models and limited editions 

Below are few special limited versions of NG900 derived from 900 SE 2.0 Turbo with  that are specific to some countries, as some local dealer produced them, or specific to the tuner that made them when ordered by dealers or Saab itself. None of them is recognizable by the VIN, all are decoded as a standard 900 SE.

R900 
1996 - Germany. R900 was the first special model of NG900, produced as a civil version of Group A race car for SAAB Germany by a tuner Uli Weinmann in Upper Franconia as an upgraded 900 SE Coupe. It was limited to 200 pieces, with some special features.

In the interior, front seats only were replaced by foldable fully leather Recaro sport seats (well known as optional equipment from Ford Cosworth and Turbo models), dashboard fascia was covered by carbon fiber and sporty metal pedals were added.
The exterior was painted pearl black metallic with R900 decals on the rear hatch, but also front fenders above turn signal lights. Color-coded mirror covers and front/rear spoilers by Zender were added, which later found their way to other limited editions and the Talladega version as a standard.
The suspension was lowered by 30 mm for exceptional handling, and 3-inch diameter stainless steel exhaust was added to provide some sporty sound. 6-spoke 17" ATS Type 10 wheels in matte silver used for NG900 first time approved 245/35 tires, or optional 225/45 16" version approved as well, described on a sticker on the driver's side B column.

Later some R900 cars were upgraded by Hirsch Performance (Swiss Saab tuner) to Stage 1, producing  and 310 N⋅m with a manual or 275 N⋅m with an automatic transmission. Acceleration from 0–100 km/h (62 mph) was reduced by this from (auto/manual) 8 to 7.4 seconds for automatics and from 9.5 to 9 seconds for manual-equipped cars. While no hardware was actually replaced on the car, this ECU modification cost around 2000 CHF at the time.
It is believed that R900 influenced the SVO project and later the Viggen model development. Many of those cars no longer exist, however, there is a discussion board that tries to keep track of some 30 cars that remained registered in Germany, but there are known examples in the Czech Republic, Baltic countries, and even Iceland.

SUN Beach 
1996/1997 - Switzerland. Price was set to 70 000 CHF at the time.

Most changes were done in the interior. All headrests were in turquoise color with the SUN Beach logo embroidered. Turquoise carbon fiber trim could be found on dashboard fascia, above the glove box, on-air vents, over the SID, radio, ashtray but also on the windows controls, even on door handles. The shifter lever gaiter and knob were also finished in Turquoise. Armrest was added to the equipment.

The exterior was painted in Neptune Turquoise Metallic color with color-coded front Zender spoiler and rearview mirrors, it was pearl effect paint shimmering between purple and green or blue. The car was lowered by 30 mm using Eibach springs and yellow Koni shock absorbers. To take further advantage of upgraded suspension, and also add to the look and style, chrome versions of wider 5-spoke 16" Moda M1 by BBS wheels were used with 225/45 tires. Since wide tires are not optimal in winter conditions, each original buyer also received a set of original 16" alloy wheels, which were fitted with 205/50 winter tires. Many of these cars are known to be equipped with Sensonic transmission.

Apart from headrests, the SUN Beach logo was also on a sticker below the outer right rear light and just above the strip on the rear quarter body panel by the door gap. It was on the wheels hubcaps too. These models are now registered in Germany, Belgium, Netherlands, Czech Republic, and even Norway.

Aero 
1996/1997 - Italy. There is no official Aero version of the NG900 compared to 9000, 9–3, or 9–5. This special version was created by the SIDAUTO dealership, then belonging to Odoardo Pagani (in his honor — by his grey suit, SAAB named the color referred to as Odardo / Edwardian grey). The actual production number of such versions is unknown, it is believed to be originally set on 200, while it is also known that not all body kits were used. No upgrades were done to the performance as well, apart from sports suspension, everything stayed the same as 900SE / 900 Talladega. All are equipped with the manual transmission, as the automatic was lacking the true sportiness.

Car was only made as a Coupe, in silver metallic or solid black, while silver is believed to be far more common. Both color versions, however, used that Odoardo grey body kit, which is a tribute to the Classic 900 SPG / Aero with a similar AirFlow body kit. Therefore, also front and rear bumpers are grey. The front bumper and rear hatch had Zender spoilers, both were color-coded together with mirrors. Metallic silver wheels were used of rather standard SAAB 3-spoke design, known from 9000 Aero version, made by RONAL as SuperAero 16" running also standard 205/50 tires. In the interior, standard black leather seats were used, some of them perforated. The same leather was used on door card inserts. Other than the carbon fiber trim on the dashboard, the interior was also standard.

The body kit consisted of a side skirt, which was one piece together with front and rear fender panels and a separate door panel. There was a SAAB name logo inserted in front fender panel, below the turn signal light. This version actually carried Aero badge (same part as on the 9000 Aero), placed after the 900 model designation on the rear hatch. Some of the body kits produced were never mounted on the Aero version (most probably because the planned production number was not reached) and were used by individuals on Talladega Coupe, R900, or even Viggen and 9-3 Convertible models. The last such body kits were sold as late as 2004.

Mellow Yellow 
1997 - SAAB Europe version. Presumably, 350 yellow SAAB NG900 Convertible models were made, of which 32 were exported as US models. Of the rest, 210 were converted to the limited edition by Rinspeed. Many sources claim there were only 150, which is known to be untrue due to special reason. An unusual accessory was supplied - wristwatch MARK XII of the Swiss brand IWC. Of course, the automatic watch was similar in appearance to the convertible. The case and dial were titanium-colored, the leather strap lights up in a rich yellow. 
The watch model was slightly different than standard MARK XII, for example instead of the words "MARK XII AUTOMATIC" the watch bore the words "SAAB AUTOMATIC". It was made in a limited number of 210 pieces. The price of the watch is now similar or even higher than the car itself. At the time of release, the car with a wristwatch as a gift accessory cost around 74 000 DM.

The car itself is mostly a standard NG900, painted in Monte Carlo yellow solid color as a tribute to much liked Classic 900 Convertible of the same color. In addition to that, it had some details in dark grey, or rather metallic titanium, like stripes on the bumpers or seat belt reel dome cover. The same color was used on the 3-spoke 17" Antera 145 wheels, with 215/40 tires, utilizing the sport suspension. There was also sporty chrome round exhaust tip in the back. Apart from above mentioned special versions, there was no spoiler used on the front or the back here. Half of the cars were supposedly equipped with manual transmissions, while the other half were automatics. Sensonic was no longer used.

Mellow Yellow by Rinspeed logo was on hubcaps of the wheels, under the outer rear left light, on the seat belt reel dome but also in the center of the gauge cluster, where all illumination was yellow instead of the original green. 
The only other change in the interior is metallic titanium trim over the SID, radio and climate controls, as well as over the windows controller. Many of those cars are still registered across Europe, some are known to be heavily tuned. Out of all mentioned, it is probably the best known NG900 special version amongst the Saab community.

Awards and achievements

1998
Best in Class, cars US$25,000-US$35,000 (900 S Turbo) - Kiplinger's Personal Finance, USA
1996
Among Top Ten Sports Cars - Consumer's Review, USA
IBCAM British Steel Auto Design Award (Saab 900 2.0i Coupé) - The Institute of British Carriage and Automobile Manufacturers, Great Britain
Best Buy - Consumers Digest, USA
New world-records for endurance, at Talladega, USA
1995
Top Car in its Price Class (Saab 900 SEV6) - American Automobile Association (AAA)
Best Buy - Consumers Digest, USA
Among Top Ten Sports Cars - Consumer's Review, USA
Technology Award 1995 for Saab Sensonic - Autocar, Great Britain

1993 and 1994
Top Choice in annual Car of the Year reader poll - Autoweek Magazine, USA
Annual Special Prize To Saab Safeseat - Motoring Journalists' Club, Denmark
One of the Ten Most Improved Cars And Trucks of 1994 - Syndicated automotive experts Mike Anson and Steven Parker, USA
Import Car of the Year 1993/94 in Japan - RJC (Automotive Researchers and Journalists Conference of Japan), Japan
Best Buy - Consumers Digest, USA
Excellent Swedish Design 1994 - The Swedish Society of Crafts and Design, Sweden
Family Car of the Year (900S) - Motoring '94, Canada
Scandinavian Design Prize 1994 - The Scandinavian Design Council (The Nordic Design Centres)
Executive Car of the Year 1994 - Portuguese Car Trophy
1993 Best Buy - Consumers Digest, USA
1994 Design of the Year - Automobile magazine, USA
Best New Car - Kiplinger's Personal Finance magazine, USA
Car of the Year 1993 - Moottori magazine, Finland
Best of What's New - Popular Science, USA
2nd Most Popular Car - STATUS magazine, Germany
1994 Technology of the Year (for Saab Trionic) - Automobile magazine, USA

Sale of intellectual rights to BAIC 
In January 2010 General Motors confirmed it was selling the intellectual property rights of the New Generation 900 along with the pre-2010 Saab 9-5 and pre-2002 Saab 9-3 to the Beijing Automotive Group (BAIC) for US$197 million. The package included three vehicle platforms, two transmission systems, and two engine systems.

References

Further reading
 Horner, Richard. The Classic Saab 900. Amberley Publishing (2016).

External links 

 Saab Museum
 Saab Museum: Saab 900 model year changes

Compact cars
Compact executive cars
Euro NCAP large family cars
Coupés
Front-wheel-drive vehicles
Hatchbacks
900
Sports sedans
Convertibles
1980s cars
1990s cars
Cars introduced in 1978